Chenopodium desiccatum is a species of flowering plant in the family Amaranthaceae known by the common names aridland goosefoot
 and slimleaf goosefoot.

It is native to parts of western North America, including sections of the Western United States and southern Western Canada. It grows naturally in open land such as prairie and dunes, chaparral, adapts well to disturbed areas such as roadsides, and in montane habitats such as in the Transverse Ranges and Sierra Nevada of California.

Description
Chenopodium desiccatum is an annual herb producing an erect, branching stem up to about 35 centimeters in maximum height. It is powdery in texture, especially on the leaves and flowers. The fleshy leaves are less than 3 centimeters long and generally oval in shape with a smooth edge. The inflorescence is an array of tightly-packed clusters of tiny flowers. Each dusty flower has a five-lobed corolla which encloses the developing fruit.

References

External links

Calflora Database: Chenopodium desiccatum (aridland goosefoot, dry goosefoot)
Jepson Manual eFlora (TJM2) treatment of Chenopodium desiccatum
Flora of North America
UC Photos gallery — Chenopodium desiccatum

desiccatum
Flora of Western Canada
Flora of the North-Central United States
Flora of the Northwestern United States
Flora of the Southwestern United States
Flora of the California desert regions
Flora of the Great Basin
Flora of the Rocky Mountains
Flora of the Sierra Nevada (United States)
Natural history of the Transverse Ranges
Flora without expected TNC conservation status